Baby Love is a 1969 British drama film directed by Alastair Reid and starring Diana Dors, Linda Hayden Keith Barron and Ann Lynn.

The film tells the story of a 15 year-old schoolgirl who seduces her adoptive family after her mother committed suicide.

Reid went on to work in television, while Linda Hayden, who was only 15 at the time of filming, later appeared in sexploitation movies, including two of the entries in the Confessions film series, Confessions of a Window Cleaner (1974) and  Confessions from a Holiday Camp (1977). The film features an uncredited appearance by Bruce Robinson, later to direct Withnail & I (1987).

Plot
Luci Thompson is a 15 year old school girl whose mother Liz, suffering from cancer, commits suicide. She goes to live with Robert Quayle, a childhood friend of Liz's, who is married to Amy and has a son, Nick. Luci’s arrival causes sexual and psychological tensions to surface, bringing the family close to destruction.

Cast
 Diana Dors as Liz Luci's Mother
 Linda Hayden as Luci 
 Troy Dante as The Lover
 Ann Lynn as Amy (as Anne Lynn)
 Sheila Steafel as Tessa Pearson
 Dick Emery as Harry Pearson
 Keith Barron as Robert
 Lewis Wilson as Priest
 Derek Lamden as Nick
 Patience Collier as Mrs. Carmichael
 Terence Brady as Man in Shop
 Marianne Stone as Manageress
 Christine Proyor as Shop Girl
 Yvonne Hormer as Shop Girl 
 Vernon Dobtcheff as Man in Cinema
 Linbert Spencer as West Indian
 Sally Stephens as Margo Pearson
 Timothy Carlton as Admiral
 Christopher Witty as Boat Crew 
 Julian Barnes as Boat Crew 
 Michael Lewis as Boat Crew
 Bruce Robinson – Man in nightclub (uncredited)

Production
The film was based on the debut novel by Tina Chad Christian. Film rights were bought by producer Michael Klinger, who had just left Compton, a production company he had run with Tony Tenser. Baby Love would be his first movie as an independent producer.

The first director attached was Henri Safran. Linda Hayden was cast after an extensive talent search. She was only fifteen years old and had to do her screen test topless.

Safran was fired by Klinger and replaced by Alistair Reid. Linda Hayden said "Michael got rid of him because I don’t think he didn’t like what he saw, or something, but ...er... it was just that little bits of it were a bit tacky."

Most of the finance came from Star Cinemas in the UK. Klinger sold the film to Joseph Levine of Anglo-Embassy for over $1 million.

Hayden later said the film was "one of those projects that could so easily have gone wrong. It could have been a bit sleazy. Alastair made the film more grounded, so it wasn’t just done for sensationalism."

Hayden recalled Diana Dors "hadn’t had a resurgence then; she was still yesterday’s news. And then suddenly, as the film came out, she had a resurgence. She was terrific. They did use her name quite a lot to hang the film on and it certainly paid off. She was quite a coup, and a smashing lady. I loved her. Her character casts a long shadow over the film. It needed somebody like that to do it." The film helped revive her career.

Reception

Box Office
The film was the 11th most watched movie of the year in the UK in 1969.

The film took over half a million dollars in both the North America and the UK, and over $300,000 in other territories.
receipts.

Howard Thompson of The New York Times gave the film a positive review, he praised the technical brilliance and wrote: "Ugly as it is in flavor and content, the picture is a genuine pint-sized spellbinder in construction, mood and mounting tension."

References

External links
 
 Baby Love at Letterbox DVD
 Baby Love at Rotten Tomatoes

1969 films
1969 drama films
British drama films
1960s English-language films
Films based on British novels
Films set in London
Embassy Pictures films
Films directed by Alastair Reid
Teensploitation
1960s British films